Neujmin is a lunar impact crater on the Moon's far side. It is nearly attached to the west-southwest of the smaller crater Waterman, and lies to the southwest of the prominent Tsiolkovskiy.

This is an eroded crater formation that has been somewhat deformed by subsequent impacts. The circular crater Neujmin P lies across the southwestern rim. There are multiple small craterlets along the northwestern rim and inner wall, most likely secondary impacts from Tsiolkovskiy, and both the northern and southern rims are disrupted.

There is a dark-halo crater on the floor of Neujmin, which typically indicates that darker material, such as mare lava, exists below present the surface.

Satellite craters 

By convention these features are identified on lunar maps by placing the letter on the side of the crater midpoint that is closest to Neujmin.

See also 
 1129 Neujmina, asteroid

References 

 
 
 
 
 
 
 
 
 
 
 
 

Impact craters on the Moon